What a Man is a 2011 German comedy film directed by Matthias Schweighöfer. It was well received by German critics and also a success at the box office. It received US$17.3 million at the box office

Plot
30-year-old elementary school teacher Alex discovers that his girlfriend Carolin has an affair with their neighbour, photographer Jens, and is forced to move out of their shared flat. He moves in with his friend, animal welfare activist Nele who has a long-distance-relationship with her French boyfriend Etienne who lives in China. Alex tries to find out why his relationship with Carolin failed and what actually constitutes a man. Meanwhile he and Nele who were in love with each other since primary school fall in love again.

Cast
 Matthias Schweighöfer as Alexander 
 Sibel Kekilli as Nele 
 Elyas M'Barek as Okke 
 Mavie Hörbiger as Carolin  
 Milan Peschel as Volker 
 Thomas Kretschmann as Jens 
 Lilay Huser as Okke's Grandma 
 Nora Jokhosha as Laura 
 Theresa Underberg as Stine 
 Joel Federico Laczlò Wüstenberg as Alexander's student 
 Gitta Schweighöfer as Ms. Schlupp 
 Friedrich Mücke as Doctor
 Katharina Schüttler as Mrs. at Checkin
 Pasquale Aleardi as Etienne
 Nora Tschirner Lady in the Panda-Costume
 Paul Alhäuser
 Andreas Nowak
 Patrick Sass as Barkeeper

Reception in the United States
Aaron Coleman of Backstage found "copying its American counterparts" made the film "warmly endearing". 
Farran Smith Nehme of the New York Post felt the plot was predictable and added "even the camera work is predictable". 
Calhoun Kersten of www.filmmonthly.com called this film "so disarmingly charming that its faults don't stop it from being an incredibly enjoyable film", no matter whether "you feel like you’ve seen it all before". 
Frank Scheck of The Hollywood Reporter judged that despite "its slavish adherence to familiar genre conventions" the film provided "reasonably fun viewing" because of its "off-kilter humor" and the "chemistry exhibited by Schweighofer and Kekilli". 
Sandrine Sahakians of www.filmequals.com recommended the film to "anyone looking to put a smile on their faces". 
Andy Webster of the New York Times conceded What a Man possibly quoted some well-known patterns but added "its sureness of tone" made Schweighöfer "a talent to watch".

References

External links

 
 
 

2011 films
2010s German-language films
2011 directorial debut films
2011 romantic comedy films
German romantic comedy films
Films directed by Matthias Schweighöfer
Films set in Frankfurt
2010s German films